The Eleanor Roosevelt Story is a 1965 American biographical documentary film directed by Richard Kaplan.

It won the Academy Award for Best Documentary Feature in 1965.

The Academy Film Archive preserved The Eleanor Roosevelt Story in 2006. Bosley Crowther of the New York Times said the film conveyed a great deal of humanity and devotion. It is one of the most moving and encouraging films.

See also
List of American films of 1965

References

External links
 

1965 films
American documentary films
Black-and-white documentary films
Documentary films about American politicians
Best Documentary Feature Academy Award winners
Documentary films about women
Works about Franklin D. Roosevelt
1965 documentary films
Films about Franklin D. Roosevelt
American black-and-white films
Eleanor Roosevelt
1960s English-language films
1960s American films